"Geezer teaser" is a pejorative term used to describe films, most often action films released direct-to-video and primarily distributed via video on demand (VOD), for which older, well-known male actors ("geezers") are billed in lead or co-lead roles and prominently featured (teased) in promotional material, but only appear sporadically during the film itself. These actors help bring attention to films that are made on a low budget but become profitable through VOD rentals and sales. The first known reference to the term was in a March 2021 Vulture article, in which film distribution executive Adam Champ attributed it to a client.

Emmett/Furla Oasis (EFO) is considered a prolific producer of these films; Bruce Willis starred in several EFO films from 2011 (Setup) until his 2022 retirement from acting, typically only working for one or two filming days per film, and sometimes appearing for as little as seven minutes of screen time as in the 2020 film Hard Kill. Other actors commonly associated with these films include Nicolas Cage, Steven Seagal, Sylvester Stallone, and John Travolta. Although such movies are rarely well-received by film critics, Lionsgate, EFO's main distributor, has stated that EFO's productions have been "consistently profitable".

Action films starring Liam Neeson have been described as the "prestige version" of the geezer teaser, while Neeson has also appeared in multiple action films each year throughout the 2010s, his screen time in most of his films is commensurate with his billing as a main character.

References 

Film and video terminology
2021 neologisms